Day of the Wacko is a 2002 Polish comedy-drama about a day in the life of Adaś Miauczyński, a frustrated, divorced, middle-aged teacher who suffers from OCD. Written and directed by Marek Koterski, the film stars Marek Kondrat, Janina Traczykówna, Andrzej Grabowski, Michał Koterski, Joanna Sienkiewicz, and Monika Donner-Trelińska. It is the sixth in a nine-part series of films about the character Miauczyński. Each story showcases a different aspect or era of his life, often with little continuity between them.

Among others, Day of the Wacko picked up several prizes at the 2003 Polish Film Awards: Kondrat won Best Actor in a Leading Role and Koterski Best Screenplay. At the 27th Polish Film Festival, Koterski was awarded a Golden Lion and the award of the Polish Filmmakers Association for "creative representation of reality"; Kondrat won Best Actor and Maria Chilarecka won for sound. The film received two Eagle Awards, for Best Leading Male Role and Best Screenplay. Day of the Wacko was also awarded the Prize of the President of the Association of Polish People of Film.

Cast and characters
 Marek Kondrat as Adaś Miauczyński
 Janina Traczykówna as Adaś's mother
 Andrzej Grabowski as Rączka
 Michał Koterski as Sylwuś
 Joanna Sienkiewicz as Adaś's ex-wife
 Monika Donner-Trelińska as Ela

References

External links
 

2002 films
Films about obsessive–compulsive disorder
Films set in Poland
Polish comedy-drama films
Polish drama films
Polish satirical films